The Federal Office Building-Cheyenne, at 308 W. 21st St. in Cheyenne, Wyoming, is a Classical Revival-style building built in 1932.  It was listed on the National Register of Historic Places in 2000.

It is a four-story masonry building  in plan, upon a full basement.  It was built to a three-story height, with capacity to add four more stories.  The fourth floor was added in 1937.

References

External links

Government buildings on the National Register of Historic Places in Wyoming
Neoclassical architecture in Wyoming
Buildings and structures completed in 1932
Laramie County, Wyoming